Dentistry for babies is a branch of Pediatric dentistry related to the dental treatment provided to children from birth to around 36 months of age, aiming to maintain or re-establish a good oral health status, at the same time as it creates a positive attitude of parents and children about Dentistry. Although concerns about dental treatment directed to babies have been reported at the beginning of the twentieth century, only recently the dental community started to focus on this area of Dentistry, due to the high dental caries (decay) prevalence observed in young children. The first setting for providing dental care exclusively to babies started in 1986, at Londrina's State University (Brazil), changing the concept from early treatment of carious lesions and their consequences to early educative-preventive attention. These concepts were disseminated through the entire country introducing new clinics with a similar philosophy such as the Baby Clinic of Araçatuba Dental School, São Paulo State University (UNESP), and also abroad.

Aims

The general aim of Dentistry for babies is to provide dental assistance to 0 – 3 year-old children, through an educative-preventive Oral Health programme directed to parents and children comprising the diagnosis, prevention, treatment and control of the most common clinical situations at this age range (dental caries, dental trauma, alterations of tooth development, etc.).

Protocol:

– Meetings with parents

At the Baby Clinic of Araçatuba Dental School, parents are required to enroll their babies from birth up to 6 months of age. Prior to the first clinical session, parents attend a lecture providing general information about:

- Oral health within the context of systemic health;

- The importance of the deciduous teeth;

- Non-nutritive sucking habits (thumb and pacifier);

- Dental trauma: what to do if it happens;

- Dental caries as a disease, and the possibility of its prevention;

- Early childhood caries;

- Caries prevention;

- Professional treatment x home care;

- How does the Baby Clinic work?

Meetings occur on a regular basis. At the end of them, parents are demonstrated how to clean the baby's mouth and how to use a fluoridated solution. Following, the baby's first appointment is booked.

– First appointment (comprises):

Anamnesis

General clinical examination, which will evaluate the baby's health as a whole. If necessary, the baby is referred to professionals of other areas for further examination.
Determination of caries risk, by correlating information gathered through anamnesis, clinical examination, along with environmental factors.

a) Influence of diet: night time feeding, consumption of cariogenic foods and beverages.

b) Influence of hygiene: presence of visible dental plaque (biofilm), presence and quality of oral hygiene procedures.

c) Use of fluorides.

d) Oral health status of parents (especially mother).

Oral examination

Specific educative orientation will be directed to parents according to the needs – baby's caries risk.
Caries risk must be determined in this first appointment. The type of assistance to be provided to the baby will depend on the risk.

For low caries risk children, the aim is to maintain the baby's of oral health. Clinical sessions include hygiene with Hydrogen peroxide (1 part of H2O2 + 3 parts of boiled or filtered water) and application of 0.1% sodium fluoride (NaF) solution using cotton swab. At home, parents/caregivers are instructed to keep the same dietary and hygiene habits, and apply a 0.05% NaF solution once/day with a cotton swab at night time, before the baby is put to sleep. Recalls are booked quarterly. At the first recall session, the caregiver will be asked to perform the hygiene procedures and to apply the fluoridated solution under professional supervision, in order to evaluate how skilled he/she is in performing those tasks, as well as to correct possible mistakes. If caries risk remains low, a quarterly scheme can be kept.

For high caries risk children, the aim is to revert the baby's caries risk, as well as to increase tooth resistance. Clinical sessions include the identification and reversion of risk factors for caries – parents are oriented on how to control (either eliminating or reducing) caries risk factors. Tooth resistance will be increased by applying a 0.1% NaF solution over all tooth surfaces. At home, parents/caregivers will adopt measures for oral hygiene and diet control, as well as remove bad oral hygiene and diet habits that increase the risk of caries development. Daily application of a 0.05% NaF solution will also be recommended. Recalls can be booked every 1 or 2 months. As for low caries risk children, the caregiver will be asked to perform the hygiene procedures and to apply the fluoridated solution under professional supervision, in order to evaluate how skilled he/she is in performing those tasks, as well as to correct possible mistakes. Caries risk must be evaluated again. Parents will be evaluated on how the recommendations done in the first session are being followed, which could potentially reduce the baby's caries risk.

For children with caries lesions, the aims are to re-establish oral equilibrium, by eliminating or reducing causal factors, as well as by increasing tooth resistance. Four clinical sessions, with a 1-week interval, are performed, so the dentist is able to act over causal factors (instructing parents), to increase tooth resistance (hygiene with diluted H2O2 solution and gauze; application of fluoride varnish over white spot lesions and softened carious lesions), as well as to restore tooth cavities with glass ionomer cement (Atraumatic Restorative Treatment). At home, parents/caregivers will adopt measures for oral hygiene and diet control, as well as daily application of a 0.05% NaF solution. The first recall is booked after 1 month, when caries risk must be re-evaluated in order to determine the appropriate periodicity for recalls. At the first recall session, the caregiver will be asked to perform the hygiene procedures and to apply the fluoridated solution under professional supervision, in order to evaluate how skilled he/she is in performing those tasks, as well as to correct possible mistakes.

Caries risk assessment will be performed on a regular basis regardless the initial caries risk evaluation, so changes in the protocol can be implemented whenever necessary.

References 

Dentistry
Pediatrics